Football Queensland Central Coast is the regional office of Football Queensland servicing the areas between Gladstone, Rockhampton and Longreach.

Role 
FQ Central Coast was established in 2021 as part of the Future of Football 2020+ Reforms.

As part of the reform journey, the local football community was invited to engage in a six-month state-wide consultation process based on improving four key areas of the game: Governance, Administration, Competitions and Affordability. Following the consultation, FQ Central Coast was created to better reflect the geography and strategic direction of the region.

The FQ Central Coast regional office has a local administrator and committee members which are elected by clubs to meet quarterly to discuss functional and geographical matters.

Clubs and competitions 
The Premier competitions in the region are the FQPL Central Men's and FQPL Central Women's, both of which form part of the Central Conference in the Football Queensland pyramid.

References 

Football Queensland
Soccer leagues in Queensland
Sports leagues established in 2021
2021 establishments in Australia
Central Queensland